Alvin Francis Lindsay, Sr. (February 3, 1882 - May 9, 1957) was an American politician from Scott County, Missouri, who served in the Missouri House of Representatives.  He was the son of carpenter and merchant John S. Lindsay and Maggie B. Record Lindsay who was originally from Indiana.  He worked as an architect in the states of Missouri, Illinois, Kentucky, and Tennessee.  Lindsay died in 1957 at Sikeston's Missouri Delta Community Hospital.

His son Alvin Francis Lindsay, Jr. was chairman of Roure Bertrand Dupont, a perfume supplier from Teaneck, New Jersey.

References

1882 births
1957 deaths
20th-century American architects
Republican Party members of the Missouri House of Representatives
People from Sikeston, Missouri
20th-century American politicians
People from Grayville, Illinois
Chicago school architects